Coleophora niphomesta is a moth of the family Coleophoridae. It is found in Afghanistan, Iran, Turkmenistan, Pakistan, Oman and the United Arab Emirates.

The larvae feed on the leaves and fruit of Climacoptera turcomanica, Aerva javanica and Aerva persica.

References

niphomesta
Moths described in 1917
Moths of the Arabian Peninsula
Moths of the Middle East